Chouto may refer to:
 Chouto (Chamusca), a civil parish in municipality of Chamusca, Portugal
 Lampros Choutos, a Greek footballer